Greg Braun is an Australian former professional tennis player.

Braun grew up on a central Queensland cattle farm and was active on the professional tour in the 1970s. During his career he twice featured in the singles main draw of the Australian Open, which included a first round loss to the top seeded Ken Rosewall in the 1976 tournament. He also played in the main draw at Wimbledon in 1973.

ATP Challenger finals

Doubles: 2 (0–2)

References

External links
 
 

Year of birth missing (living people)
Living people
Australian male tennis players
Tennis people from Queensland
20th-century Australian people